Tsagaannuur (white lake) is a sum (district) of Bayan-Ölgii Province in western Mongolia. It is primarily inhabited by ethnic Kazakhs. As of 2014 it had a population of 1436 people.

The administrative center of the Tsagaannuur sum is the starting point of a road to Russia, which is an important trade connection for the region and the Aimag capital Ölgii.

Tsagaan Nuur Free Economic Zone

The Tsagaan Nuur Free Economic Zone was established in November 2005 to catalyze the development of the western region of Mongolia. The Free Economic Zone is about 708.4 hectares in size and is on flat land covered with pebble and rocky soil. Two rivers flowing by on the west and north sides of the Free Economic Zone form the water supplies for the zone. The Tsagaan Nuur Free Economic Zone has been granted the following special free trade features:

Goods imported from overseas to a free zone shall be exempt from the levy of import tax, customs duties, VAT and excise tax.
 No taxes shall be charged for goods entering a free zone, which are previously imported into the customs territory upon payment of import tax, customs duties, VAT and excise tax. Deductions shall be made from other taxes against presentation of payment receipts for taxes paid in the customs territory.
 No taxes shall be levied on goods exiting a free zone to overseas

References

Populated places in Mongolia
Districts of Bayan-Ölgii Province